{{Infobox former subdivision
|native_name            = Область Войска ДонскогоOblast' voyska Donskogo|conventional_long_name =
|common_name            = Don Host Oblast
|subdivision            = Oblast
|nation                 = Russian Empire
|status_text            = 
|capital                = Novocherkassk
|latd= |latm= |latNS= |longd= |longm= |longEW=
|today                  = Russia
|year_start             = 1786
|year_end               = 1920
|event_start            = Named
|date_start             = 
|event_end              = Dissolution
|date_end               = 
|image_flag             = 
|image_coat             = Герб Области Войска Донского 1878.svg
|image_map              = Донского Войска Область 1900.svg
|flag_type              = 
|flag                   = List of Russian flags#Imperial_Flags
|p1                     = Yekaterinoslav Viceroyalty
|flag_p1                = Coat of Arms of Yekaterinoslav.png
|s1                     = Russian Soviet Federative Socialist Republic
|flag_s1                = Flag of Russian SFSR (1918-1937).svg
}}

The Province (Oblast) of the Don Cossack Host''' (Oblast’ Voyska Donskogo'') of Imperial Russia was the official name of the territory of Don Cossacks, coinciding approximately with the present-day Rostov Oblast of Russia. Its site of administration was Cherkassk, relocated later to Novocherkassk.

The province comprised the areas where the Don Cossack Host settled in the Russian Empire. From 1786 the territory was officially named the Lands of the Host of the Don, renamed Don Host Province in 1870.

During 1913, the oblast, with an area of about 165,000 km², had about 3.8 million inhabitants. Of these, 55% (2.1 million) were Cossacks in possession of all the land; the remaining 45% of the population being townsfolk and agricultural guest labourers from other parts of Russia.

This subdivision was abolished in 1920; from the major part of it the Don Oblast of the RSFSR was created, which was incorporated into the North Caucasus Krai in 1924.

References

 
History of the Don Cossacks
Oblasts of the Russian Empire
States and territories established in 1786
1786 establishments in the Russian Empire
1920 disestablishments in Russia
Military districts of the Russian Empire